The Minnesota House of Representatives is the lower house of the legislature of the U.S. state of Minnesota. It has 134 members, twice as many as the Minnesota Senate. Floor sessions are held in the north wing of the State Capitol in Saint Paul. Member and staff offices, as well as most committee hearings, are in the nearby State Office Building.

History
The Minnesota House of Representatives held its first session on September 3, 1849.

In 1913, Minnesota legislators began to be elected on nonpartisan ballots. While campaigning and caucusing, legislators identified themselves as "Liberals" or "Conservatives." In 1973, a law change brought party designations back, beginning with the 1974 Minnesota House of Representatives election. 

After the Nineteenth Amendment was ratified in 1920, women were eligible for election to the legislature. In 1922, Mabeth Hurd Paige, Hannah Kempfer, Sue Metzger Dickey Hough, and Myrtle Cain were elected to the House of Representatives. As of 2023, a record-high 54 women serve in the House.

Elections
Each Senate district is divided in half and given the suffix A or B (for example, House district 32B is in Senate district 32). Members are elected to two-year terms. Districts are redrawn after the decennial United States Census in time for the primary and general elections in years ending in 2. The most recent election was on November 8, 2022.

Composition
93nd Minnesota Legislature (2023–2025)

Members, 2023–24
The 2023–24 Minnesota Legislature was sworn into office on January 3, 2023 with 70 DFL members and 64 Republican members.

The effects of redistricting and a large number of retirements at the end of the previous session resulted in 39 races without an incumbent. 16 races went uncontested, all in noncompetitive districts. In the 2022 Minnesota House of Representatives elections, eight incumbents lost, with five Republicans and three DFLers failing to be reelected.

The 2023-24 class of representatives has 47 newly elected members, or 35% of the total membership. Of those 47, 25 are Republican and 19 are DFL. Three former DFL members returned to the chamber for non-consecutive terms (Jeff Brand, Jerry Newton and Brad Tabke).

See also
 Minnesota Senate
 Minnesota Legislature
 Past composition of the House of Representatives
Political party strength in Minnesota

Notes

References

External links
 

House
State lower houses in the United States